Palazzago is a comune (municipality) in the Province of Bergamo in the Italian region of Lombardy, located about  northeast of Milan and about  northwest of Bergamo.

Palazzago borders the following municipalities: Almenno San Bartolomeo, Ambivere, Barzana, Caprino Bergamasco, Mapello, Pontida, Roncola.

Demographic evolution

References